Valentina Cortese (1 January 1923 – 10 July 2019), sometimes credited as Valentina Cortesa, was an Italian film and theatre actress. In her 50 years spanning career, she appeared in films of Italian and international directors like Michelangelo Antonioni, Federico Fellini, Franco Zeffirelli, François Truffaut, Joseph L. Mankiewicz and others.

Biography

Cortese was born in Milan to a single mother and raised in the countryside, before being sent to Turin to live with her maternal grandparents in 1930. After meeting conductor Victor de Sabata, then married with children and 31 years her senior, she quit high school and followed him to Rome, where she enrolled at (and later graduated from) the National Academy of Dramatic Arts (Accademia d'arte drammatica). She first appeared on stage before receiving a contract at Scalera Film in 1941 and giving her film debut with a small role in L'orizzonte dipinto.

Cortese's first important film roles were in Roma Città Libera (1946), Les Misérables and The Wandering Jew (both 1948). 1948 also saw the end of her relationship with de Sabata. Her appearance in the British production The Glass Mountain (1949) led to numerous roles in international productions, including Jules Dassin's Thieves' Highway (1949), opted by her then-partner Dassin over the originally cast Shelley Winters, and Robert Wise's The House on Telegraph Hill (1951). In 1951, she married her The House on Telegraph Hill co-star Richard Basehart, with whom she returned to Italy. Cortese continued to appear in national and international productions; the most notable of this era include Joseph Mankiewicz's The Barefoot Contessa (1954) and Michelangelo Antonioni's Le Amiche (1955). For the latter, she received the Nastro d'Argento for Best Supporting Actress.

In 1960, Cortese and Basehart divorced, and Basehart returned to the US, leaving in her custody their only child, Jackie. In the following years, she worked for directors as diverse as Mario Bava (The Girl Who Knew Too Much, 1963), Bernhard Wicki (The Visit, 1964), Federico Fellini (Juliet of the Spirits, 1965), Robert Aldrich (The Legend of Lylah Clare, 1968) and Joseph Losey (The Assassination of Trotsky, 1972). For her performance in François Truffaut's Day for Night (1973) she received the BAFTA Award, the National Society of Film Critics Award and the New York Film Critics Circle Award, and was nominated for the Academy Award.

While her later films were mostly of lesser artistic interest, Cortese was continuously successful on stage, working with Giorgio Strehler, with whom she had a long lasting relationship, Franco Zeffirelli, Luchino Visconti and Patrice Chéreau. In 1980, she married industrialist Carlo De Angeli. Her last film was Zeffirelli's 1993 Sparrow.

Cortese died on 10 July 2019, aged 96. In 2017, Francesco Patierno documented her life in the film Diva!, based on her 2012 autobiography Quanti sono i domani passati ("How many tomorrows have gone by").

Selected filmography

 L'orizzonte dipinto (1941)
 L'attore scomparso (1941)
 The Hero of Venice (1941) – Alina
 First Love (1941) – Nerina Redi
 Girl of the Golden West (1942) – Madge / Juanita
 The Jester's Supper (1942) – Lisabetta
 The Queen of Navarre (1942) – Eleonora d'Austria
 Soltanto un bacio (1942) – Maria Renda / Luisa Renda
 Orizzonte di sangue (1942) – Lidia
 Quarta pagina (1942) – Valentina, la sua segretaria
 Happy Days (1942) – Marianna
 4 ragazze sognano (1943) – Enrichetta Dorlence
 La carica degli eroi (1943)
 Nessuno torna indietro (1945) – Valentina
 The Ten Commandments (1945) – (segment "Non nominare il nome di Dio invano")
 Chi l'ha visto? (1945) – Luisella
 Roma città libera (1946) – La ragazza
 A Yank in Rome (1946) – Maria, La maestrina
 Bullet for Stefano (1947) – Barbara
 The Courier of the King (1947) – Louise de Renal
 Les Misérables (1948) – Fantine and Cosette
 The Wandering Jew (1948) – Esther
 Crossroads of Passion (1948) – Maria Pilar
 The Glass Mountain (1949) – Alida
 Black Magic (1949) – Zoraida
 Thieves' Highway (1949) – Rica
 Malaya (1949) – Luana
 Women Without Names (1950) – Anna Petrovic the Jugoslav
 Shadow of the Eagle (1950) – Elizabeth, Princess Tarakanova
 The Rival of the Empress (1951) – Principessa Tarakanova
 The House on Telegraph Hill (1951) – Victoria Kowelska
 Secret People (1952) – Maria
 Lulu (1953) – Lulù
 Jealousy (1953) – Agrippina (voice, uncredited)
 The Walk (1953) – Lisa
 Angels of Darkness (1954) – Vally
 Marriage (1954) – Natalia Stefanovna Chubukova
 Avanzi di galera (1954) – Moglie di Luprandi
 The Barefoot Contessa (1954) – Eleanora Torlato-Favrini
 Adriana Lecouvreur (1955) – Adriana Lecouvreur
 Le Amiche (1955) – Nene
 Il conte Aquila (1955) – Teresa Casati
 Faccia da mascalzone (1956)
 Magic Fire (1956) – Mathilde Wesendonk
 The Rocket from Calabuch (1956) – Eloisa, the Schoolmistress
 Dimentica il mio passato (1957)
 Kean – Genio e sregolatezza (1957) – Fanny (uncredited)
 Amore a prima vista (1958)
 Love and Troubles (1958) – Marisa
 Square of Violence (1961) – Erica Bernardi
 Barabbas (1961) – Julia
 Axel Munthe, The Doctor of San Michele (1962) – Eleonora Duse
 The Girl Who Knew Too Much (1963) – Laura Craven-Torrani
 The Visit (1964) – Mathilda Miller
 The Possessed (1965) – Irma
 Juliet of the Spirits (1965) – Valentina
 Soleil noir (1966) – Maria
 The Legend of Lylah Clare (1968) – Countess Bozo Bedoni
 Listen, Let's Make Love (1968) – Lallo's Mother
 Oh, Grandmother's Dead (1968) – Ornella
 The Secret of Santa Vittoria (1969) – Gabriella (uncredited)
 Give Her the Moon (1970) – Madeleine de Lépine
 First Love (1970) – Mother
 The Love Mates (1970) – Eva
 The Boat on the Grass (1971) – Christine
 The Iguana with the Tongue of Fire (1971) – Mrs. Sobiesky
 Chronicle of a Homicide (1972) – Luisa Sola
 Brother Sun, Sister Moon (1972) – Pica Di Bernardone
 The Assassination of Trotsky (1972) – Natalia Sedowa Trotsky
 Day for Night (1973) – Séverine
 Appassionata (1974) – Elisa Rutelli
 Tendre Dracula (1974) – (uncredited)
 The Kiss of Death (1974) – Elizabeth Blixen
 Amore mio non farmi male (1974) – Sabina Foschini
 Dracula in the Provinces (1975) – Olghina Franchetti
 Kidnap Syndicate (1975) – Grazia Filippini
 Son tornate a fiorire le rose (1975) – Sabina Foschini
 Nick the Sting (1976) – Regina – Nick's Mother
 The Big Operator (1976) – The Widow
 Jesus of Nazareth (1977, TV Mini-Series) – Herodias
 Nido de viudas (1977) – Dolores
 Tanto va la gatta al lardo... (1978) – Vilma / Leonilde Bosco Casagrande
 Satan's Wife (1979) – Elena Merrill
 When Time Ran Out (1980) – Rose Valdez
 La ferdinanda: Sonate für eine Medici-Villa (1982) – Caterina de Dominicis
 Via Montenapoleone (1987) – Madre di Guido
 Tango blu (1987) – Rachele Cigno
 Young Toscanini (1988) – Comparsa (uncredited)
 The Adventures of Baron Munchausen (1988) – Queen Ariadne / Violet
 Buster's Bedroom (1991) – Serafina Tannenbaum
 Sparrow (1993) – Mother Superior (final film role)

References

External links
 
 
 
 

1923 births
2019 deaths
Italian film actresses
Italian stage actresses
Italian television actresses
Actresses from Milan
Best Supporting Actress BAFTA Award winners
Nastro d'Argento winners
20th-century Italian actresses